The Capella Rocks form a low, rocky ridge composed of several nunataks, located near the head of Bertram Glacier,  northeast of the Auriga Nunataks, in Palmer Land. They were named by the UK Antarctic Place-Names Committee after the star Capella in the constellation of Auriga.

References 

Ridges of Palmer Land